Upper Flood Swallet which was originally known as Blackmoor Flood Swallet, is an exceptionally well-decorated cave near Charterhouse, in the carboniferous limestone of the Mendip Hills, in Somerset, England. The cave is part of the Cheddar Complex SSSI.

The entrance was revealed in the Great Flood of 1968,  giving the cave its name. It was dug consistently since then with breakthroughs occurring in 1971, 1972, 1985 and 2006.

As of September 2008 it is over 3.5 km in length and around 125 m deep.

The 2006 breakthrough

In September 2006 cavers squeezed through an excavated boulder choke into new passage.  In a series of three digging trips they discovered 1.2 km of well decorated cave.

See also 
 Caves of the Mendip Hills

References

External links
 YouTube video showing pictures of the discoveries made by the Mendip Caving Group in Upper Flood Swallet in 2006.

Caves of the Mendip Hills
Limestone caves
Wild caves